Orte is a town, comune, former Catholic bishopric and Latin titular see in the province of Viterbo, in the central Italian region of Lazio, located about  north of Rome and about  east of Viterbo.

Geography 
Orte is situated in the Tiber valley on a high tuff cliff, encircled to North and East from a handle of the Tevere river. It is an important road and rail hub.

History 
The Etruscans inhabited the area from the 6th century BC and called it Hurta, as testified by the findings in a necropolis nearby, now preserved in the Vatican Museums. Two major battles between Etruscans and Romans (310 and 283 BC) were fought nearby on the shores of the Vadimone lake. The Romans were victorious both times.

The Romans domination made it the municipality of Horta (also Hortanum). Under the rule of Augustus it received numerous public works. Because of its strategic position, Orte was occupied in succession by the Ostrogoths, the Byzantines and the Lombards. During the late 9th to early 10th century, along with much of central Italy, Orte was also held or threatened by the Saracens.

In the Middle Ages the city was never seat of a fief, becoming a free comune under a podestà (elected magistrature). Later it became part of the Papal States.

Ecclesiastical history 
 700: Established as Diocese of Orte (Italian) / Hortanum (Latin) / Hortan(us) (Latin adjective)
 Basilica concattedrale di Santa Maria Assunta: Suppressed a sole cathedral of a diocese on 1437.10.05, its territory and title being merged into the accordingly renamed Diocese of Civita Castellana e Orte, where its former cathedral became co-cathedral, which is a Minor Basilica, dedicated to the Assumption of Mary
Church of San Biagio

Residential Bishops 
 San Lanno ? (III - IV secolo)
 Giovanni Montano ? (mentioned in 330)
 San Cassiano ? (in 363)
 Leone (in 384)[15]
 Martiniano (o Marziano) ? (in 502)
 Ubaldo Prosenio ? (in 592)
 Blando ? (in 598)
 Calunnioso ? (in 600)
 Giuliano (in 649)
 Maurizio (on 743)
 Adone or Adamo (in 761)
 Stefano I (in 826)
 Arsenio (first in 855 - death August 868)[6]
 Zaccaria (in 869)
 Stefano II (in 904)
 Pietro I (in 916)
 Giorgio (in 963)[16]
 Lamberto (in 1005)[17]
 Giovanni I (prima del 1017 - dopo il 1024)[17]
 Landovino (in 1036)[17]
 Gregorio (in 1049)[18]
 Rodolfo (prima del 1126 - dopo il 1149[19])
 Paolo I (prima del 1168 - dopo il 1196)
 Paolo II (in 1200 circa)
 Giovanni II (prima del 6 October 1206 - after 2 October 1212)
 Guido (1221 - after 1224)
 Trasimondo (prima del 1239 - dopo il 1243)
 Giovanni III (in 1248)
 Pietro II, O.F.M. (12 April 1255 - death after 1259)
 Corrado (19 December 1284 - ?)
 Bartolomeo (26 January 1296 - 1298 deceduto)
 Lorenzo da Velletri, O.F.M. (3 October 1298 - death 1333 or 1334)
 Nicolò Zabereschi (1 March 1339[20] - death 1362)
 Giovanni IV (25 July 1363 - ?)
 Pietro III (in 1365)
 Giovanni Cappucci[21], O.P. (1366 - death 1393)
 Paolo Alberti, O.F.M. (12 November 1395[22] - 13 may 1420), next Bishop of Ajaccio )
 Sante (17 June[23] 1420 - 19 March 1432), next Bishop of Civita Castellana )[24]
 =? Sancho (? – 1431), next Bishop of Ciudad Rodrigo (Spain) (1431 – 1433)
 Valentino (19 March 1432 - 15 May 1439), next first Bishop of successor see Civita Castellana and Orte) .

Titular see 
In 1991 the diocese was nominally restored as Latin Titular bishopric of Orte (Italian) / Hortanum (Latin) / Hortan(us) (Latin).

It has had the following incumbents, so far of the fitting Episcopal (lowest) rank :
 José de Jesús Madera Uribe, Missionaries of the Holy Spirit (M.Sp.S.) (1991.05.28 – death 2017.01.21) as Auxiliary Bishop of the Military Ordinariate of United States of America (army archbishopric, USA) (1991.05.28 – 2004.09.15) and as emeritate; previously Coadjutor Bishop of Diocese of Fresno (USA) (1979.12.18 – 1980.07.01), succeeding as Bishop of Fresno (1980.07.01 – 1991.05.28)
 Bishop-elect Andrzej Przybylski (2017.05.20 – ...), as Auxiliary Bishop of Archdiocese of Częstochowa (Poland) (2017.05.20 – ...).

Events 
Sant'Egidio Abate's Day and Ottava of Sant'Egidio: from 31 August to the second Sunday in September. A Medieval festival with shows, fairs, conventions, seminaries of study, art exhibitions of art and archery competitions (the "Palio", contented by the archers of the Seven Contrade).
Religious procession of Dead Christ: every Friday before Easter. A torchlight procession representing early religions orders ("Confraternity").

Transport 
Orte railway station, opened in 1865, forms part of the Florence–Rome railway and the Ancona–Orte railway.  It is situated in Piazza Giovanni XXIII, in the locality of Orte Scalo, approximately two kilometres southeast of the town centre.

See also 
 List of Catholic dioceses in Italy

References

Sources and external links 

 Orte municipal website
 Ottovamedievale.it
 GCatholic - former & titular bishopric
 Bibliography - ecclesiastical history
 Ferdinando Ughelli, Italia sacra, vol. I, second edition, Venice 1717, coll. 733-743
 Tommaso M. Mamachi, De episcopatus hortani antiquitate ad hortanos cives liber singularis, Rome 1759
 Giuseppe Cappelletti, Le Chiese d'Italia della loro origine sino ai nostri giorni, vol. VI, Venice 1847, pp. 23–49
 Louis Duchesne, Le sedi episcopali nell'antico ducato di Roma, in Archivio della romana società di storia patria, Volume XV, Rome 1892, p. 491
 Paul Fridolin Kehr, Italia Pontificia, vol. II, Berlin 1907, pp. 192–194
 Gerhard Schwartz, Die Besetzung der Bistümer Reichsitaliens unter den Sächsischen und Salischen Kaisern : mit den Listen der Bischöfe, 951-1122, Leipzig-Berlin 1913, p. 259
 Francesco Lanzoni, Le diocesi d'Italia dalle origini al principio del secolo VII (an. 604), vol. I, Faenza 1927, pp. 546–547
 Pius Bonifacius Gams, Series episcoporum Ecclesiae Catholicae, Leipzig 1931, pp. 685–686
 Konrad Eubel, Hierarchia Catholica Medii Aevi'', vol. 1, pp. 278–279; vol. 2, pp. XXVI e 166

Cities and towns in Lazio